General elections were held in Saint Lucia on 3 May 1982. The result was a victory for the United Workers Party, which won fourteen of the seventeen seats. Voter turnout was 65.8%.

Results

References

Saint Lucia
Elections in Saint Lucia
General
Saint Lucia